Justin Keller (born March 4, 1986) is a Canadian former professional ice hockey forward who last played for Italian club HCB South Tyrol in the Austrian Hockey League (EBEL). He was selected by the Tampa Bay Lightning in the 8th round (245th overall) of the 2004 NHL Entry Draft.

Playing career
Keller had played 256 games in the American Hockey League with the Springfield Falcons and Norfolk Admirals prior to signing with Austria's EHC Black Wings Linz for the 2010–11 season. He has also endured a shortened stint with EC Red Bull Salzburg before moving to another EBEL competitor the Vienna Capitals mid-season.

After spending the full 2013–14 season in Vienna, compiling 14 goals for 29 points in 50 games, Keller left as a free agent to sign a one-year contract with his fourth EBEL club and defending champions HC Bolzano, on August 21, 2014. Justin is currently playing local hockey in the Summerland Reds Tournament for the Ice Ninjas team.

Career statistics

Awards and honours

References

External links

1986 births
Living people
Augusta Lynx players
Bolzano HC players
EC Red Bull Salzburg players
EHC Black Wings Linz players
Kelowna Rockets players
Norfolk Admirals players
Springfield Falcons players
Tampa Bay Lightning draft picks
Vienna Capitals players
Canadian ice hockey forwards